Tony Albert (born 1981) is a contemporary Australian artist working in a wide range of mediums including painting, photography and mixed media. His work engages with political, historical and cultural Aboriginal and Australian history, and his fascination with kitsch “Aboriginalia".

Biography
Albert was born in 1981 in Townsville, North Queensland. In 2004 he graduated from the Queensland College of Art, Griffith University, Brisbane, with a degree in Contemporary Australian Indigenous Art. Albert's family is from Cardwell, Queensland and he is a descendant of the Girramay, Yidinji and Kuku-Yalanji peoples.

Albert was a founding member of the urban-based Indigenous art collective ProppaNOW founded in 2004. ProppaNOW also included artists Richard Bell, Jennifer Herd, Vernon Ah Kee, Fiona Foley, Bianca Beetson, and Andrea Fisher.

Work 
Like Bell and Ah Kee, the use of text is essential to Albert's practice. Headhunter (2007), an installation consisted of various objects Albert had been collecting for several years, portrays the past racism in Australia and puts emphasis on "the commodification of Aboriginal people for consumption by the non-Indigenous population, at a time when actual engagements with Aboriginal people were rare and predominantly paternalistic."

The application of text can also be seen in Albert's photographic work such as Hey ya! (Shake it like a Polaroid picture) (2007).

Awards and commissions

In 2014 Albert won first prize in the National Aboriginal & Torres Strait Islander Art Award with his work We can be Heroes, prompted by the 2012 shooting by police of two Aboriginal teenagers in Kings Cross.  Albert's was the first photographic work to win the prize.

In 2015, Albert was commissioned by the City of Sydney to create Yininmadyemi - Thou didst let fall, a public work for Hyde Park, Sydney. The work serves as a memorial to Aboriginal military history and features four large upright bullets and shell casings. He was the Archibald Prize finalist in 2016 and 2017.

Exhibitions
Albert's work has been the subject of nine solo exhibitions and over fifty group exhibitions.

References

External links
 Official site
 Tony Albert at the Art Gallery of New South Wales
 Tony Albert at UnDisclosed

People from Townsville
21st-century Australian photographers
1981 births
Living people
Griffith University alumni
21st-century Australian painters
21st-century Australian male artists
Photographers from Queensland
Indigenous Australian artists
Archibald Prize finalists
Mixed-media artists
Australian male painters